CD-204 or No. 204 was a Type D escort ship of the Imperial Japanese Navy during World War II. She was the last of her class.

History
She was laid down on 27 February 1945 at the Nagasaki shipyard of Mitsubishi Heavy Industries for the benefit of the Imperial Japanese Navy and launched on 14 April 1945. On 11 July 1945, she was completed and commissioned in the Sasebo Naval District with captain Zenji Tanaka (田中　善次) as her commanding officer. On 17 July 1945, she was damaged in an accident in Senzaki harbor and then traveled to Maizuru for repairs. The war ended before repairs commenced. On 20 November 1945, she was struck from the Naval List and scrapped on 31 January 1948.

References

1945 ships
Type D escort ships
Ships built by Mitsubishi Heavy Industries